Chinyelu Bessum Asher (born 20 May 1993) is an American-born Jamaican professional footballer who plays as a midfielder for AIK, as well as the Jamaica women's national team.

Early life
Chinyelu Asher started playing football at age 9, was taught how to play by her father, Kevin Asher, who is Jamaican. Asher ran track and cross country throughout high school, making repeated appearances to Nationals and Junior Olympics. Simultaneously, Asher played with Freestate United and would play in her school's boys' team during trainings.

College career
Between 2011 and 2013, Asher played for the Purdue Boilermakers. She later transferred to Louisville Cardinals in 2014.

Club career
Asher joined BIIK-Kazygurt in 2016 and played 7 matches of the 2016–17 UEFA Women's Champions League. She later joined Santa Fe, where her team won the 2017 season and post-season tournament and played all games in the 2017 Copa Libertadores Femenina. In 2018, Asher was invited to attend preseason and was a non-roster player for Washington Spirit. Asher joined Stabæk in January 2019.

Asher re-joined Washington Spirit on 8 April 2021.

International career
Although born in the United States, Asher qualified to represent Jamaica through her father, who is Jamaican. Asher made her debut with the Jamaica U-20 in 2012 during the 2012 CONCACAF Women's U-20 Championship. Asher made her senior debut in the 2016 CONCACAF Women's Olympic Qualifying Championship qualification, on 25 August 2015 versus the Dominican Republic.

Asher was selected for Jamaica's 2019 FIFA Women's World Cup squad. She made her World Cup debut during the team's first group stage match against Brazil in Grenoble.

International goals
Scores and results list Jamaica's goal tally first

Personal life
Asher's mother is of Cameroonian descent and father is of Afro-Jamaican descent, and played soccer collegiately at Howard University. Asher has an older brother named Daniel Asher, who played soccer at Saint Leo University. Asher is the second youngest of five siblings.

References

External links

1993 births
Living people
Citizens of Jamaica through descent
Jamaican women's footballers
Women's association football midfielders
BIIK Kazygurt players
Independiente Santa Fe footballers
Stabæk Fotball Kvinner players
Toppserien players
Jamaica women's international footballers
2019 FIFA Women's World Cup players
Jamaican people of Cameroonian descent
Sportspeople of Cameroonian descent
Jamaican expatriate women's footballers
Jamaican expatriate sportspeople in Kazakhstan
Expatriate women's footballers in Kazakhstan
Jamaican expatriate sportspeople in Colombia
Expatriate women's footballers in Colombia
Jamaican expatriate sportspeople in Norway
Expatriate women's footballers in Norway
People from Silver Spring, Maryland
Sportspeople from Montgomery County, Maryland
Soccer players from Maryland
American women's soccer players
Purdue Boilermakers women's soccer players
Louisville Cardinals women's soccer players
Washington Spirit players
African-American women's soccer players
American sportspeople of Jamaican descent
American people of Cameroonian descent
American sportspeople of African descent
American expatriate women's soccer players
American expatriate sportspeople in Kazakhstan
American expatriate sportspeople in Colombia
American expatriate sportspeople in Norway
Washington Spirit players
21st-century African-American sportspeople
21st-century African-American women
National Women's Soccer League players